Lavernose-Lacasse is a commune in the Haute-Garonne department in southwestern France.

Geography
The Louge flows northeast through the middle of the commune and crosses the village.

Population

Transport
 Gare du Fauga

See also
 Communes of the Haute-Garonne department
 Alfred Mayssonnié

References

Communes of Haute-Garonne